Gabrielle Danièle Marguerite Andrée Girard (9 October 1926 – 17 October 2015), known by her stage name Danièle Delorme, was a French actress and film producer, famous for her roles in films directed by Marc Allégret, Julien Duvivier or Yves Robert.

Life and Career 
Delorme was born in Levallois-Perret, Hauts-de-Seine, one of four children to the well-known painter, poster-maker and theater-designer André Girard and his wife Andrée (nee Jouan). Girard maintained a studio in Venice in 1936–37 and in Manhattan in 1938. Back in France he was not called up in 1939. After the Battle of France, M. Girard removed to Antibes, then a free-zone and set up a network which provided recruiting and spying work for the French resistance. It was during this time that young Delorme began her acting career.

In 1940 at the age of 14 Delorme began acting and played a series of minor roles before she began acting in film. Two years later, owing to her father's contacts, she was able at  16 years old (at the time using the name Danièle Girard) to secure a bit part in The Beautiful Adventure (La Belle aventure (1942)).

Two years later director Marc Allégret again used Delorme, this time in a large role. This time she performed on the stage name she would use for the rest of her career, Danièl Delorme. One story developed that she took the name in order to hide from the Gestapo her relationship to her father. But the suggestion came from character actor Bernard Blier, who performed with her in her second film to take the name from the heroine of Victor Hugo's play Marion Delorme. (Delorme would co-star with Blier two decades later in the philosophical courtroom criminal drama, The Seventh Juror (Le septième juré (1962)).

During the first decade of her career Delorme played delicate, demure, bright young women, roles for which she was physically fitted. Her first husband, Daniel Gélin, who also performed in The Beautiful Adventure, said she had "the face of a little girl, an upturned nose with passionate nostrils, the lips of a child, the body of a woman and a certain way about her that turns heads." Richard W. Seaver of the New York Times described her as "a winsome wisp of an actress, with her soft smile and grey eyes." These features finally landed her a breakthrough role in Miquette et sa mère (1949).

Also notable was her performanace as femme fatale in Julien Duvivier's Voici le temps des assassin (1956) (Deadlier Than the Male in the US and Twelve Hours to Live in the UK), co-starring with Jean Gabin.

In 1960 Delorme joined more than 140 intellectuals, teachers, writers and celebrities in signing a manifesto supporting the right of French conscripts to refuse military service in Algeria. As a result, the French government on 28 September issued a ban against all signatories from appearing on state-run radio or television or in state-run theaters. At the same time the information minister said that another cabinet order was in preparation that would deny government funding to any film project in which any signatory appeared.

Personal life 
In 1945, Delorme married actor Daniel Gélin with whom she had a son, Xavier (1946–1999). Delorme divorced Gélin in 1954 after he admitted having an affair with Romanian-born model Marie Christine Schneider, that produced a daughter, Maria Schneider. Delorme's son was a successful actor who died of cancer in 1999, aged 53. In 1956, Delorme married actor/filmmaker Yves Robert who partnered her in an award-winning film production company. They remained married until his death in 2002.

Delorme served as a member of the Caméra d'Or jury at the 1988 Cannes Film Festival.

Delorme died in Paris on 17 October 2015 at the age of 89. Her death was announced on 19 October by the director of the Paris art gallery An Girard, which she created to present, among other things, the works of her father. According to the statement, she died in her sleep after years of illness.

Selected filmography 

 The Beautiful Adventure (1942) – Monique
 Les Petites du quai aux fleurs (1944) – Bérénice Grimaud
 Twilight (1944) – La camarade de Félicie (uncredited)
 Lunegarde (1946)
 The Captain (1946)
 Les J3 (1946) – Une élève
 Ouvert pour cause d'inventaire (1946)
 Les jeux sont faits (1947) – La noyée
 Croisière pour l'inconnu (1948)
 Dilemma of Two Angels (1948) – Anne-Marie
 Gigi (1949) – Gilberte dite 'Gigi'
 Cage of Girls (1949) – Micheline
 Agnès de rien (1950) – Agnès de Chaligny
 Miquette (1950) – Miquette Grandier
 Minne, l'ingénue libertine (1950) – Minne
 Bed for Two; Rendezvous with Luck (1950) – Michèle
 Lost Souvenirs (1950) – Danièle (segment "Une cravate de fourrure")
 Without Leaving an Address (1951) – Thérèse Ravenaz
 Olivia (1951) – Une ancienne élève (uncredited)
 Venom and Eternity (1951) – Herself
 Desperate Decision (1952) – Catherine
 L'Amour, Madame (1952) – Herself (uncredited)
 The Long Teeth (1953) – Eva Commandeur – la fiancée puis la femme de Louis
 Women of Paris (1953) – Jeune femme cliente du Ruban Bleu (uncredited)
 Le Guérisseur (1953) – Isabelle Dancey
 Mara (1953)
 Royal Affairs in Versailles (1954) – Louison Chabray
 A Slice of Life (1954) – Mara (segment "Mara")
 House of Ricordi (1954) – Maria
 Huis clos (1954) – Florence Langlois (uncredited)
 Black Dossier (1955) – Yvonne Dutoit
 Deadlier Than the Male (1956) – Catherine
 Mitsou (1956) – Mitsou
 Les Misérables (1958) – Fantine
 Neither Seen Nor Recognized (1958) – L'admiratrice (uncredited)
 Chaque jour a son secret (1958) – Olga Lezcano
 Women's Prison (1958) – Alice Rémon ou Dumas
 Cléo from 5 to 7 (1962) – La vendeuse de fleurs / Actress in silent film
 The Seventh Juror (1962) – Geneviève Duval
 Marie Soleil (1964) – Marie-Soleil
 Des Christs par milliers (1969) – Danièle
 Hoa-Binh (1970) – French Nurse
 Le Voyou (1970) – Janine
 Repeated Absences (1972) – La mère de François
 Belle (1973) – Jeanne
 Touch Me Not (1974) – Lilian
 Pardon Mon Affaire (1976) – Marthe Dorsay
 Pardon Mon Affaire, Too! (1976) – Marthe Dorsay
 La barricade du Point du Jour (1978) – La Générale Eudes
 Dirty Dreamer (1978)
 The Crying Woman (1979)
 Qu'est-ce qui fait courir David? (1982) – Georges
 La côte d'amour (1982) – Helle Waver
  (1985) – Ferial's mother
 Bal perdu (1990) – Maryse de Belloise
 Les eaux dormantes (1992) – Mme de Lespinière
 Sortez des rangs (1996) – Mme Germaine

References

External links 
 
 Profile, purepeople.com; accessed 10 July 2015. 

1926 births
2015 deaths
20th-century French actresses
21st-century French actresses
French film actresses
French film producers
French television actresses
People from Levallois-Perret